Clum Hill is a mountain in Greene County, New York. It is located in the Catskill Mountains south of Tannersville. Parker Mountain is located north-northwest, and Roundtop Mountain is located southeast of Clum Hill.

References

Mountains of Greene County, New York
Mountains of New York (state)